Statistics of Swedish football Division 2 in season 1998.

League standings

Division 2 Norrland

Division 2 Östra Svealand

Division 2 Västra Svealand

Division 2 Östra Götaland

Division 2 Västra Götaland

Division 2 Södra Götaland

References
Sweden - List of final tables (Clas Glenning)

1998
3
Sweden
Sweden